Jaghan (also Romanized as Jaghān and Jeghān) is a village in Takht Rural District, Takht District, Bandar Abbas County, Hormozgan Province, Iran. At the 2006 census, its population was 101, in 23 families.

References 

Populated places in Bandar Abbas County